The 2016 Axalta "We Paint Winners" 400 was a NASCAR Sprint Cup Series stock car race held on June 6, 2016 at Pocono Raceway in Long Pond, Pennsylvania. The race,  postponed a day because of persistent rain, was contested over 160 laps on the  triangular racecourse, and was the fourteenth race of the 2016 NASCAR Sprint Cup Series.

Kurt Busch scored his first and only victory of the 2016 season, his third career victory at Pocono and first win at the track since 2007. the race had 14 lead changes among different drivers and ten cautions for 40 laps.

Background 

The race was held at Pocono Raceway, which is a three-turn superspeedway located in Long Pond, Pennsylvania. The track hosts two annual NASCAR Sprint Cup Series races: the Axalta "We Paint Winners" 400 and the Pennsylvania 400, as well as one Xfinity Series and Camping World Truck Series event.  Since 2013, the track is also host to a Verizon IndyCar Series race.

Pocono Raceway is one of a very few NASCAR tracks not owned by either Speedway Motorsports, Inc. or International Speedway Corporation. It is operated by the Igdalsky siblings Brandon, Nicholas, and sister Ashley, and cousins Joseph IV and Chase Mattioli, all of whom are third-generation members of the family-owned Mattco Inc, started by Joseph II and Rose Mattioli.

Outside of the NASCAR races, the track is used throughout the year by Sports Car Club of America (SCCA) and motorcycle clubs as well as racing schools and an IndyCar race. The triangular oval also has three separate infield sections of racetrack – North Course, East Course and South Course. Each of these infield sections use a separate portion of the tri-oval to complete the track.  During regular non-race weekends, multiple clubs can use the track by running on different infield sections.  Also some of the infield sections can be run in either direction, or multiple infield sections can be put together – such as running the North Course and the South Course and using the tri-oval to connect the two.

Entry list 
The preliminary entry list for the race included forty cars and was released on May 30, 2016 at 12:48 pm ET.

First practice 

Qualifying 

He said after qualifying that his car was "really fast. My teammate Joey Logano, he’s really fast. He’s probably not really happy I won the pole, but it goes the other way sometimes where he gets it.” He also added that he "felt really good when we ran the first round and I was third and knew I had a little more speed left. We ran the second round and I didn’t feel I had anything left and was still third. I got down into turn one on my last run there and it kind of bottomed out and shot up the hill a little and I wasn’t very confident at all. I have learned over time that these things have a way of working themselves out when they are meant to be and I guess today was meant to be.”

Joey Logano, who qualified second, said his qualifying performance was "similar to last week when I won the first two rounds and came in second in the last one. It stings a little bit because I really wanted to get a pole. We're mad about second and it's a good thing when you're mad about second because it means your organization and your team is where it needs to be mad." He also added that he's "excited about the race Sunday" and that Pocono "has been a good race track for us in the past.”

Qualifying results

Final practice 

Race 
The race was scheduled to run on Sunday, June 5 at 1:00 p.m., but rain forced the race to be postponed to Monday.

First half

Start 
Under mostly sunny Pennsylvania skies, Brad Keselowski led the field to the green flag at 12:13 p.m. Teammate Joey Logano passed him exiting turn 1 to take the lead. The first caution of the race flew on lap 4 for a single-car spin in turn 3. Riding the high line, Matt DiBenedetto got loose and spun out. He managed to save it without touching the wall.

The race restarted on lap 7. The second caution of the race flew on lap 16. It was a scheduled competition caution for overnight rain. Kyle Larson opted not to pit and assumed the lead. Kevin Harvick and Kasey Kahne were tagged for speeding on pit road and restarted the race from the tail-end of the field.

The race restarted on lap 20. The third caution of the race flew on lap 22 for a single-car spin in turn 1. Rounding the turn, Brian Scott got loose, made contact with the wall and spun out. Keselowski was called to pit road for unapproved body modifications. More specifically, one of his crew members dented in a side panel that could give the car an aerodynamic advantage.

The race restarted on lap 27. Larson pitted from the lead the same lap and handed the lead to Matt Kenseth. A number of cars began pitting on lap 52. Kenseth made his stop on lap 54 and handed the lead to Harvick. The fourth caution of the race flew on lap 60 for a single-car wreck in turn 1 involving DiBenedetto. He would go on to finish 40th. Harvick pitted under the caution and handed the lead back to Kenseth. Aric Almirola was tagged for his crew being over the wall too soon and restarted the race from the tail-end of the field.

Second quarter 

The race restarted on lap 66. Chase Elliott drove under Kenseth and Kyle Busch to take the lead on lap 67. A number of cars began pitting on lap 86. Elliott hit pit road on lap 87 and handed the lead to Busch. Debris in turn 2 brought out the fifth caution of the race on lap 88. Busch pitted under the caution and the lead cycled back to Elliott.

Second half

Halfway 
The race restarted on lap 93 and a multi-car wreck on the Long Pond Straightaway brought out the sixth caution of the race. Exiting turn 1, Tony Stewart got loose, got into teammate Danica Patrick, hit the wall, came down the track, clipped Landon Cassill and sent him into the wall.

The race restarted with 62 laps to go. The seventh caution of the race flew with 58 laps to go for a single-car wreck in turn 1. Going into the turn, Michael Annett suffered a left-front tire blowout and slammed the wall.

The race restarted with 52 laps to go. The eighth caution of the race flew with 51 laps to go for a single-car wreck on the Long Pond straightaway. Exiting turn 1, Ryan Newman made contact with Busch and sent him into the wall. Chris Buescher also spun out trying to avoid the wreck.

The race restarted with 47 laps to go. The ninth caution of the race flew with 43 laps to go for a single-car wreck in turn 1. Going into the turn, Austin Dillon suffered a right-front brake rotor failure and slammed the wall. A. J. Allmendinger opted not to pit under the caution and assumed the lead. He pitted the next lap, however, and handed the lead to Ty Dillon.

Fourth quarter 
The race restarted with 38 laps to go and a single-car wreck in turn 1 brought out the 10th caution of the race. Rounding the turn, Jimmie Johnson got loose, saved the car but slammed the inside wall. Dillon pitted under the caution and handed the lead to Dale Earnhardt Jr.

The race restarted with 33 laps to go. After a drag race to the line, Kurt Busch took the lead from Earnhardt with 32 laps to go. With his remaining fuel load in question, he saved enough to score the victory.

Post-race

Driver comments 

"It's tough to balance everything," Busch said in victory lane. "We had a fast car and an interim crew chief. And we didn't know if we had enough fuel to make it. ... This was a wonderful win for us. We've been so close all year. It's just so much fun to drive and be up front."

Earnhardt said afterwards that the race "was a good run for us. The car wasn’t all we hoped it would be, but it was good." However, he felt he "should have been able to hold that 41 off on that final restart. Me and the 24 was racing pretty hard and it gave the 41 the opportunity to get a run on us,” Earnhardt said. “If I could have got in front of him I don’t think he would have got by us."

After finishing third, Keselowski took issue with comments made by Fox Sports color commentator Jeff Gordon saying Fox "need[s] to get some people that aren't inbred to the sport and own teams and have internal knowledge, because that is pretty crappy. It is what it is."

Elliott, who finished fourth after leading a race-high of 51 laps, said he "made a big mistake there behind [Earnhardt] in the tunnel [Turn 2]. I wish I had been a little more patient and given ourselves a better chance, but you live and you learn."

Race results

Race summary 
 Lead changes: 14 among different drivers
 Cautions/Laps: 10 for 40
 Red flags: 0
 Time of race: 3 hours, 11 minutes, and 15 seconds
 Average speed:

Media

Television 
Fox NASCAR televised the race in the United States on FS1 for the second consecutive year. Mike Joy was the lap-by-lap announcer, while six-time Pocono winner, Jeff Gordon and four-time winner Darrell Waltrip were the color commentators. Jamie Little, Vince Welch and Matt Yocum reported from pit lane during the race.

Radio 
Radio coverage of the race was broadcast by Motor Racing Network (MRN) and simulcasted on Sirius XM NASCAR Radio. Joe Moore, Jeff Striegle and four-time Pocono winner Rusty Wallace announced the race in the booth while the field was racing on the front stretch. Dave Moody called the race from atop a billboard outside of turn 1 when the field was racing through turn 1 while Mike Bagley called the race from a billboard outside turn 2 when the field was racing through turn 2. Kyle Rickey reported the race from a billboard outside turn 3 when the field was racing through turn 3. Alex Hayden, Glenn Jarrett and Steve Post reported from pit lane during the race.

Standings after the race 

Note: Only the first 16 positions are included for the driver standings.. – Driver has clinched a position in the Chase for the Sprint Cup.

References 

Axalta "We Paint Winners" 400
Axalta "We Paint Winners" 400
NASCAR races at Pocono Raceway
Axalta "We Paint Winners" 400